Theodore Fulton Stevens Sr. (November 18, 1923 – August 9, 2010) was an American politician and lawyer who served as a U.S. Senator from Alaska from 1968 to 2009. He was the longest-serving Republican Senator in history at the time he left office, surpassing Strom Thurmond in 2007, though his record was later surpassed on January 13, 2017, by Utah Senator Orrin Hatch. Hatch was overtaken in 2023 by Chuck Grassley. He was the president pro tempore of the United States Senate in the 108th and 109th Congresses from January 3, 2003, to January 3, 2007, and was the third U.S. Senator to hold the title of president pro tempore emeritus. He was previously Solicitor of the Department of the Interior from September 1960 to January 1961.

Stevens served for six decades in the American public sector, beginning with his service as a pilot in World WarII. In 1952, his law career took him to Fairbanks, Alaska, where he was appointed U.S. Attorney the following year by President Dwight D. Eisenhower. In 1956, he returned to Washington, D. C., to work in the Eisenhower Interior Department, eventually rising to become Senior Counsel and Solicitor of the Department of the Interior, where he played an important role as an executive official in bringing about and lobbying for statehood for Alaska.

After winning the Republican nomination, Stevens challenged Democratic incumbent Ernest Gruening in the 1962 Senate election, though he was defeated. Afterwards, he was elected to the Alaska House of Representatives in 1964 and became House majority leader in his second term. In 1968, Stevens ran unsuccessfully for the Republican nomination for U.S. Senate, losing to Elmer Rasmuson, but was appointed to Alaska's other Senate seat when it became vacant later that year. As a Senator, Stevens played key roles in legislation that shaped Alaska's economic and social development, with Alaskans describing Stevens as "the state's largest industry". This legislation included the Alaska Native Claims Settlement Act, the Trans-Alaska Pipeline Authorization Act, the Alaska National Interest Lands Conservation Act, and the Magnuson–Stevens Fishery Conservation and Management Act. He was also known for his sponsorship of the Amateur Sports Act of 1978, which resulted in the establishment of the United States Olympic & Paralympic Committee.

In 2008, Stevens was embroiled in a federal corruption trial as he ran for re-election to the Senate. He was initially found guilty, and, eight days later, he was narrowly defeated by Anchorage Mayor Mark Begich. Stevens was the most senior U.S. Senator to have ever lost a reelection bid. However, before his sentencing, the indictment was dismissed – effectively vacating the conviction – when a Justice Department probe found evidence of gross prosecutorial misconduct. Stevens died on August 9, 2010, near Dillingham, Alaska, when a de Havilland Canada DHC-3 Otter he and several others were flying in crashed en route to a private fishing lodge. Former NASA Administrator Sean O'Keefe and future NASA Deputy Administrator James Morhard survived the crash.

Early life and career

Childhood and youth

Stevens was born November 18, 1923, in Indianapolis, Indiana, the third of four children, in a small cottage built by his paternal grandfather after the marriage of his parents, Gertrude S. (née Chancellor) and George A. Stevens. The family later lived in Chicago, where George Stevens was an accountant before losing his job during the Great Depression. Around this time, when Ted Stevens was six years old, his parents divorced, and Stevens and his three siblings went back to Indianapolis to reside with their paternal grandparents, followed shortly thereafter by their father, who developed problems with his eyes and went blind for several years. Stevens's mother moved to California and sent for Stevens's siblings as she could afford to, but Stevens stayed in Indianapolis helping to care for his father and a mentally disabled cousin, Patricia Acker, who also lived with the family. The only adult in the household with a job was Stevens's grandfather. Stevens helped to support the family by working as a newsboy, and would later remember selling many newspapers on March 1, 1932, when newspaper headlines blared the news of the Lindbergh kidnapping.

In 1934 Stevens's grandfather punctured a lung in a fall down a tall flight of stairs, contracted pneumonia, and died. Stevens's father, George, died in 1957 in Tulsa, Oklahoma, of lung cancer. Stevens and his cousin Patricia moved to Manhattan Beach, California in 1938, by which time both of Stevens's grandparents had died, to live with Patricia's mother, Gladys Swindells. Stevens attended Redondo Union High School, participating in extracurricular activities including working on the school newspaper and becoming a member of a student theater group, a service society affiliated with the YMCA, and, during his senior year, the Lettermen's Society. Stevens also worked at jobs before and after school, but still had time for surfing with his friend Russell Green, son of the president of Signal Gas and Oil Company, who remained a close friend throughout Stevens's life.

Military service

After graduating from high school in 1942, Stevens enrolled at Oregon State University to study engineering, attending for a semester. With World WarII in progress, Stevens attempted to join the Navy and serve in naval aviation, but failed the vision exam. He corrected his vision through a course of prescribed eye exercises, and in 1943 he was accepted into an Army Air Force Air Cadet program at Montana State College. After scoring near the top of an aptitude test for flight training, Stevens was transferred to preflight training in Santa Ana, California; he received his wings early in 1944.

Stevens served in the China-Burma-India theater with the Fourteenth Air Force Transport Section, which supported the "Flying Tigers", from 1944 to 1945. He and other pilots in the transport section flew C-46 and C-47 transport planes, often without escort, mostly in support of Chinese units fighting the Japanese. Stevens received the Distinguished Flying Cross for flying behind enemy lines, the Air Medal, and the Yuan Hai Medal awarded by the Chinese Nationalist government. He was discharged from the Army Air Forces in March 1946.

Higher education and law school

After the war, Stevens attended the University of California, Los Angeles (UCLA), where he earned a Bachelor of Arts degree in political science in 1947. While at UCLA, he was a member of Delta Kappa Epsilon fraternity (Theta Rho chapter). He applied to law school at Stanford and the University of Michigan, but on the advice of his friend Russell Green's father to "look East", he applied to Harvard Law School, which he ended up attending. Stevens's education was partly financed by the G.I. Bill; he made up the difference by selling his blood, borrowing money from an uncle, and working several jobs including one as a bartender in Boston. During the summer of 1949, Stevens was a research assistant in the office of the U.S. Attorney for the Southern District of California (now the Central District of California).

While at Harvard, Stevens wrote a paper on maritime law which received honorable mention for the Addison Brown prize, a Harvard Law School award for the best essay by a student on a subject related to private international law or maritime law. The essay later became a Harvard Law Review article whose scholarship Justice Jay Rabinowitz of the Alaska Supreme Court praised 45 years later, telling the Anchorage Daily News in 1994 that the high court had issued a recent opinion citing the article. Stevens graduated from Harvard Law School in 1950.

Early legal career

After graduating, Stevens went to work in the Washington, D.C., law offices of Northcutt Ely. Twenty years earlier Ely had been executive assistant to Secretary of the Interior Ray Lyman Wilbur during the Hoover administration, and by 1950 headed a prominent law firm specializing in natural resources issues. One of Ely's clients, Emil Usibelli, founder of the Usibelli Coal Mine in Healy, Alaska, was trying to sell coal to the military, and Stevens was assigned to handle his legal affairs.

Marriage and family

Early in 1952, Stevens married Ann Mary Cherrington, a Democrat and the adopted daughter of University of Denver Chancellor Ben Mark Cherrington. She had graduated from Reed College in Portland, Oregon, and during Truman's administration had worked for the State Department.

On December 4, 1978, the crash of a Learjet 25C on approach at Anchorage International Airport killed five of the seven aboard; Stevens survived (concussion, broken ribs), but his wife Ann didnot. Stevens would later state in an interview with the Anchorage Times "I can't remember anything that happened." Smiling, he added "I'm still here. It must be my Scots blood." The building which houses the Alaska chapter of the American Red Cross at 235 East Eighth Avenue in Anchorage is named in her memory; likewise a reading room at the Loussac Library.

Stevens and Ann had three sons (Ben A. Stevens Sr., Walter, and Ted) and two daughters (Susan Covich and Elizabeth "Beth" Harper Stevens). Democratic Governor Tony Knowles appointed Ben to the Alaska Senate in 2001, where he served as the president of the state senate until the fall of 2006.

Ted Stevens remarried in 1980. He and his second wife, Catherine, had a daughter, Lily.

Stevens spent many years living at the Knik Arms, a six-story residential building constructed in 1950 on the western edge of downtown Anchorage. In his earlier years in the Senate, he would often point to this residence when trying to drive home the point that he was not of means and had not achieved such through his Senate service.

Originally purchased as a vacation home, Stevens later lived there full-time.

Prostate cancer

Stevens was a survivor of prostate cancer and had publicly disclosed his cancer. He was nominated for the first Golden Glove Awards for Prostate Cancer by the National Prostate Cancer Coalition (NPCC). He advocated the creation of the Congressionally Directed Medical Research Program for Prostate Cancer at the Department of Defense, which has funded nearly $750million for prostate cancer research. Stevens was a recipient of the Presidential Citation by the American Urological Association for significantly promoting urology causes.

Early Alaska career

In 1952, while still working for Northcutt Ely, Stevens volunteered for the presidential campaign of Dwight D. Eisenhower, writing position papers for the campaign on western water law and lands. By the time Eisenhower won the election that November, Stevens had acquired contacts who told him, "We want you to come over to Interior." Stevens left his job with Ely, but a job in the Eisenhower administration didn't come through as a result of a temporary hiring freeze instituted by Eisenhower in an effort to reduce spending.

Instead, Stevens was offered a job with the Fairbanks, Alaska, law firm of Emil Usibelli's Alaska attorney, Charles Clasby, whose firm (Collins &Clasby) had just lost one of its attorneys. Stevens and his wife had met and liked both Usibelli and Clasby, and decided to make the move. Loading up their 1947 Buick and traveling on a $600 loan from Clasby, they drove across country from Washington, D.C., and up the Alaska Highway in the dead of winter, arriving in Fairbanks in February 1953. Stevens later recalled kidding Governor Walter Hickel about the loan. "He likes to say that he came to Alaska with 38 cents in his pocket," he said of Hickel. "I came $600 in debt." Ann Stevens recalled in 1968 that they made the move to Alaska "on a six-month trial basis".

In Fairbanks, Stevens cultivated the city's Republican establishment. He befriended conservative newspaper publisher C.W. Snedden, who had purchased the Fairbanks Daily News-Miner in 1950. Snedden's wife Helen later recalled that her husband and Stevens were "like father and son". "The only problem Ted had was that he had a temper," she told a reporter in 1994, crediting her husband with helping to steady Stevens "like you would do with your children" and with teaching Stevens the art of diplomacy.

U.S. Attorney

Stevens had been with Charles Clasby's law firm for six months when Robert J. McNealy, a Democrat appointed as U.S. Attorney for Fairbanks during the Truman administration, informed U.S. District Judge Harry Pratt he would be resigning effective August 15, 1953, having already delayed his resignation by several months at the request of Justice Department officials newly appointed by Eisenhower. The latter had asked McNealy to delay his resignation until Eisenhower could appoint a replacement. Despite Stevens's short tenure as an Alaska resident and his relative lack of trial or criminal law experience, Pratt asked Stevens to serve in the position until Eisenhower acted. Stevens agreed. "I said, 'Sure, I'd like to do that,'" Stevens recalled years later. "Clasby said, 'It's not going to pay you as much money, but, if you want to do it, that's your business.' He was very pissed that I decided to go." Most members of the Fairbanks Bar Association were outraged at the appointment of a newcomer, and members in attendance at the association's meeting that December voted to support Carl Messenger for the permanent appointment, an endorsement seconded by the Alaska Republican Party Committee for the Fairbanks-area judicial division. However, Stevens was favored by Attorney General Herbert Brownell, by Senator William F. Knowland of California, and by the Republican National Committee, (Alaska itself had no Senators at this time, as it was still a territory). Eisenhower sent Stevens's nomination to the U.S. Senate, which confirmed him on March 30, 1954.

Stevens soon gained a reputation as an active prosecutor who vigorously prosecuted violations of federal and territorial liquor, drug, and prostitution laws, characterized by Fairbanks area homesteader Niilo Koponen (who later served in the Alaska State House of Representatives from 1982 to 1991) as "this rough tough shorty of a district attorney who was going to crush crime". Stevens sometimes accompanied U.S. Marshals on raids. As recounted years later by Justice Jay Rabinowitz, "U.S. marshals went in with Tommy guns and Ted led the charge, smoking a stogie and with six guns on his hips."

Stevens also became known for his explosive temper, which was focused particularly on a criminal defense lawyer named Warren A. Taylor who would later go on to become the Alaska Legislature's first Speaker of the House in the First Alaska State Legislature. "Ted would get red in the face, blow up and stalk out of the courtroom," a former court clerk later recalled of Stevens's relationship with Taylor. Later on, a former colleague of Stevens would "cringe at remembering hearing Stevens through the wall of their Anchorage law office berating clients." Stevens' wife, Ann, would make her husband read self-help books to try and calm him down, although this effort was to no avail. As one observer remembered: "He (Stevens) would lose his temper about the stupidest things. Even when you would agree with him, he got mad at you for agreeing with him."

In 1956, in a trial which received national headlines, Stevens prosecuted Jack Marler; a former Internal Revenue Service agent accused of failing to file tax returns. Marler's first trial, which was handled by a different prosecutor, had ended in a deadlocked jury and a mistrial. For the second trial, Stevens was up against Edgar Paul Boyko, a flamboyant Anchorage attorney who built his defense of Marler on the theory of no taxation without representation, citing the Territory of Alaska's lack of representation in the U.S. Congress. As recalled by Boyko, his closing argument to the jury was a rabble-rousing appeal for the jury to "strike a blow for Alaskan freedom", claiming that "this case was the jury's chance to move Alaska toward statehood." Boyko remembered that "Ted had done a hell of a job in the case," but Boyko's tactics paid off, and Marler was acquitted on April 3, 1956. Following the acquittal, Stevens issued a statement saying, "I don't believe the jury's verdict is an expression of resistance to taxes or law enforcement or the start of a Boston Tea Party. I do believe, however, that the decision will be a blow to the hopes for Alaska statehood."

Department of the Interior

Alaska statehood

In March 1956, Stevens's friend Elmer Bennett, legislative counsel in the Department of the Interior, was promoted by Secretary of the Interior Douglas McKay to the Secretary's office. Bennett successfully lobbied McKay to replace him in his old job with Stevens, and Stevens returned to Washington, D.C., to take up the position. By the time he arrived in June 1956, McKay had resigned in order to run for the U.S. Senate from his home state of Oregon, and Fred Andrew Seaton had been appointed to replace him. Seaton, a newspaper publisher from Nebraska, was a close friend of Fairbanks Daily News-Miner publisher C.W. Snedden, and in common with Snedden was an advocate of Alaska statehood, unlike McKay, who had been lukewarm in his support. Seaton asked Snedden if he knew any Alaskan who could come to Washington, D.C. to work for Alaska statehood; Snedden replied that the man he needed (Stevens) was already there working in the Department of the Interior. The fight for Alaska statehood became Stevens's principal work at Interior. "He did all the work on statehood," Roger Ernst, Seaton's assistant secretary for public land management, later said of Stevens. "He wrote 90 percent of all the speeches. Statehood was his main project." A sign on Stevens's door proclaimed his office as "Alaskan Headquarters", and Stevens became known at the Department of the Interior as "Mr. Alaska", sharing this nickname with Alaska's territorial delegate, E.L. Bob Bartlett

Efforts to make Alaska a state had been going on since 1943, and had nearly come to fruition during the Truman administration in 1950 when a statehood bill passed in the U.S. House of Representatives, only to die in the Senate. The national Republican Party opposed statehood for Alaska, in part out of fear that Alaska would elect Democrats to Congress, while the Southern Democrats opposed statehood, believing that the addition of 2 new pro-civil rights Senators would jeopardize the Solid South's control on Congressional law. At the time Stevens arrived in Washington, D.C., to take up his new job, a constitutional convention to write an Alaska constitution had just been concluded on the campus of the University of Alaska in Fairbanks. The 55 delegates also elected three unofficial representatives (all Democrats) as unofficial delegates to Congress: Ernest Gruening and William Egan as U.S. Senators and Ralph Rivers as U.S. representative.

President Eisenhower, a Republican, regarded Alaska as too large and sparsely populated to be economically self-sufficient as a state, and furthermore saw statehood as an obstacle to effective defense of Alaska should the Soviet Union seek to invade it. Eisenhower was especially worried about the sparsely populated areas of northern and western Alaska. In March 1954, he had drawn a line on a map indicating his opinion of the portions of Alaska which he felt ought to remain in federal hands even if Alaska were granted statehood.

Seaton and Stevens worked with Gen. Nathan Twining, Chairman of the Joint Chiefs of Staff, who had served in Alaska; and Jack L. Stempler, a top Defense Department attorney, to create a compromise that would address Eisenhower's concerns. Much of their work was conducted in a hospital room at Walter Reed Army Hospital, where Seaton was being treated for back problems. Their work concentrated on refining the line on the map that Eisenhower had drawn in 1954, one which became known as the PYK Line after three rivers (the Porcupine, Yukon, and Kuskokwim) whose courses defined much of the line. The PYK Line was the basis for Section10 of the Alaska Statehood Act, which Stevens wrote. Under Section 10, the land north and west of the PYK Linewhich included the entirety of Alaska's North Slope, the Seward Peninsula, most of the Yukon-Kuskokwim Delta, the western portions of the Alaska Peninsula, and the Aleutian and Pribilof Islandswould be part of the new state, but the president would be granted emergency powers to establish special national defense withdrawals in those areas if deemed necessary. "It's still in the law but it's never been exercised," Stevens later recollected. "Now that the problem with Russia is gone, it's surplusage. But it is a special law that only applies to Alaska."

Stevens also took part (illegally) in lobbying for the statehood bill, working closely with the Alaska Statehood Committee from his office at Interior. Stevens hired Marilyn Atwood, daughter of Anchorage Times publisher Robert Atwood, who was chairman of the Alaska Statehood Committee, to work with him in the Interior Department. "We were violating the law," Stevens told a researcher in an October 1977 oral history interview for the Eisenhower Library. "[W]e were lobbying from the executive branch, and there's been a statute against that for a long time.... We more or less, I would say, masterminded the House and Senate attack from the executive branch." Stevens and the younger Atwood created file cards on members of Congress based on "whether they were Rotarians or Kiwanians or Catholics or Baptists and veterans or loggers, the whole thing", Stevens said in the 1977 interview. "And we'd assigned these Alaskans to go talk to individual members of the Senate and split them down on the basis of people that had something in common with them." The lobbying campaign extended to presidential press conferences. "We set Ike up quite often at press conferences by planting questions about Alaska statehood," Stevens said in the 1977 interview. "We never let a press conference go by without getting someone to try to ask him about statehood." Newspapers were also targeted, according to Stevens. "We planted editorials in weeklies and dailies and newspapers in the district of people we thought were opposed to us or states where they were opposed to us so that suddenly they were thinking twice about opposing us."

The Alaska Statehood Act became law with Eisenhower's signature on July 7, 1958, and Alaska formally was admitted to statehood on January 3, 1959, when Eisenhower signed the Alaska Statehood Proclamation.

On September 15, 1960, George W. Abbott resigned as Solicitor of the Interior to become Assistant Secretary, and Stevens became Solicitor. He stayed in this office until the Eisenhower administration left office on January 20, 1961.

Alaska House of Representatives

After returning to Alaska, Stevens founded Stevens & Savage, a law firm in Anchorage. Stevens was then joined by H. Russel Holland, who later became a federal judge on the U.S. District Court for the District of Alaska, and the firm's name changed to Stevens, Savage & Holland. Stevens became a member of Operation Rampart, a group in favor of building the Rampart Dam, a hydroelectric project on the Yukon River. Elected to the Alaska House of Representatives in 1964, he became House Majority Leader in his second term.

U.S. Senator

Service

Stevens' service as a United States Senator was, at first, marked with instability and controversy. Mike Gravel had no issue with Stevens being the senior senator, because he was 7 years Stevens' junior, and Stevens had been in public service for longer than he had. Stevens was a party loyalist, and, even after losing the 1968 Republican primary, Stevens embarked on a state-wide campaign for the Republican nominee, Elmer Rasmuson, where Stevens attacked Gravel on his time as Speaker of the Alaska House of Representatives. When they were being sworn in together in 1969, Stevens approached Gravel and apologized, asking if they could be friends and "let political bygones be bygones", so that they could work together. However, Gravel, unappreciative of Stevens' attacks, replied "I don't want to be your friend, Ted. I didn't appreciate you going around the state and lying about me." Gravel and Stevens never made it up, with Gravel later recalling of his relationship with Stevens: "We'd talk about things. I'd joke with him. He's got a sense of humor. But he didn't use it on me unless I was the butt of it."

The 2 Alaskan freshmen senators' first committee meeting in March 1969 would end up in disaster. Stevens was seated to the right of the Committee on Interior and Insular Affairs' chairman, powerful Washington senator Henry "Scoop" Jackson, with Mike Gravel at Jackson's left. Jackson had always held a meeting at the start of a new Congress to let the members of the Committee have their say about what they thought the Committee's priorities should be. Ted stood up and took over the meeting, loudly stating: "The first priority of this committee had to be settlement of Alaska Native land claims. This committee hadn't had the guts to do it at statehood." By the end of the meeting, Stevens and Gravel had ended up in a shouting match, constantly interrupting and disrespecting each other. Reporters were covering the dispute as Stevens and Gravel boiled out into the hallway, fists raised. Both Stevens and Gravel gave statements to the press in a makeshift conference before Jackson interrupted, ending both the conference and the fight.

Stevens' knowledge on Senate protocol remained small throughout the next few months, with one incident in April during the discussion of S.1830 leading to Stevens lecturing Jackson and the committee. However, Jackson put his foot down, stating "Now just a minute. You're new here and I want to tell you how these things are handled." Jackson had been a steadfast supporter of Alaska Statehood, and was always close with Alaska's U.S. Senators. Ed Weinberg would recall that: "Jackson treated Ted Stevens like Ted was an errant school boy and, in effect, made him sit in the corner with a dunce cap on. Jackson wasn't about to let Ted Stevens take over the hearings and the framing of this legislation."

On October 13, 1978, the last day of the 95th Congress, the Alaska National Interest Lands Conservation Act, an act to protect & conserve a third of Alaska as 'America's last huge, untouched wilderness', an act which Stevens championed after providing a compromise with Mo Udall, was killed by junior senator Mike Gravel, in an attempt to spite Stevens. The day before, Gravel had written to Stevens that he intended to oppose any attempt of a compromise, wanting instead to completely kill the bill. On the day, the bill was granted an extension for a year by the House, but when the Senate debated the extension, Gravel stood up and killed the extension, stating that he knew the other senators had "worked hard on the compromise. It frequently astounded me how members could meet so much on a subject that affected someone else's state." Gravel would then add that he "had been willing to rise above this and work on the compromise, even though much of it was anathema to what I thought was right and in the best interests of Alaska and the nation." 

Eventually, Democratic New Hampshire Senator John A. Durkin rose. "There might be somebody asleep in the gallery who the senator is fooling, but the whole chamber knows what the senator is up to. He is out to torpedo this bill." Gravel rebutted "I will not admit that!", continuing to speak until Senate Majority Leader Robert Byrd took the bill out of consideration. The Senate descended into anger, with Stevens then rising and stating that Gravel was lying, and that his lies would lead to Interior Secretary Cecil Andrus & President Jimmy Carter taking away 'millions of acres of Alaska from development'. Durkin then rose again; "We worked out an extension to protect Alaska, and he is torpedoing that now. I hope the press is listening as well as every village in Alaska so when the secretary invokes the Antiquities Act there will be no ticker-tape parade. Short-term expedience is torpedoing both bills today. The people of Alaska should know that this compromise foundered on two words, after 47 markups, and those two words are 'Mike Gravel.'"

Gravel would argue that Stevens was selling out, and, in rebuttal, Stevens told the press that Gravel had broken his word, adding "My mistake was trusting him. Gravel is an international playboy who needs psychiatric help. What he was thinking of when he killed the bill God knows, and I'm not even sure if God could fathom his thinking."

On December 4, 1978, Stevens had a meeting scheduled in Anchorage with the leaders of Citizens for the Management of Alaska's Lands, the major pro-development, lobbying group. On the same day, Alaska's governor, Jay Hammond, would be inaugurated in Juneau for his second term. Tony Motley, the head of CMAL, arranged for a friend's private plane to pick them up in Juneau after the inauguration and fly them to Anchorage for the meeting. During takeoff from Anchorage International, the plane had risen only three or four feet above the runway when it was hit by a sudden, violent gust of wind. The plane was flipped around so that it pointed straight up in the air. In an attempt to re-orient the plane, the pilot pulled back the throttle, but the plane stalled and fell back to the ground. The last thing Motley remembers is thinking that it was about to hit directly on its tail. Only Stevens and Motley survived the crash. The other five people aboard the plane, a group which included Stevens' wife of 26 years, Ann Stevens died.

By all accounts, Stevens had been considered as one of the Senate's happiest marriages; his wife's death hitting him very hard. At the time of the crash Gravel was on a trip to Saudi Arabia, but he flew back for Ann Stevens' funeral. Afterwards, Gravel told one of Stevens' aides that he'd like to express his condolences personally. The aide disappeared and a moment later came back and told Gravel that Sen. Stevens didn't wish to see him. When Stevens came back to Washington, he seemed 'bitter and in terrible emotional pain'. He began to drop hints, in both Washington and Alaska, that he felt the only reason he was in that plane in the first place was that he had to piece the effort for a land bill back together, and that the only reason he had to do that was that Mike Gravel killed the bill. Most of his remarks in this vein were tactfully not printed by reporters, who saw them as the musings of a 'man half-insane with grief'.

However, on February 6, 1979, Stevens was testifying before Udall's House Committee on Interior and Insular Affairs, which was just starting to reconsider the lands bill, and he brought up the plane crash. "It was on that trip to Alaska to reconstitute the efforts for the coming year that I and Tony Motley, who passed away in an accident, were involved in an accident," he said, apparently forgetting for a moment that Motley had survived. "The trip was neither spur-of-the-moment nor stopgap. It was and is to me the beginning of this year's effort to achieve an acceptable D2 lands bill. As I am sure you realize, and many of you can imagine, the solution of the issue means even more to me than it did before." He stated a few things about the bill, before adding: "I don't want to get personal about it, but I think if that bill had passed, I might have a wife sitting at home when I get home tonight, too."

In 1979, Stevens began to court primary challengers to Gravel for his re-election campaign the following year. After some courting, Stevens decided to back Clark Gruening, the grandson of the man Gravel had defeated in the primary 12 years prior. Gruening would defeat Gravel in the primary by a margin of 11 points. Gruening would then lose the election to Frank Murkowski by 7 points, who would hold on to the seat until 2002, when he was elected Governor. His daughter, Lisa Murkowski, still holds the seat as of 2023.

Stevens' fiery attitude greatly assisted Stevens in pushing the highly controversial nomination of Alaska Governor Wally Hickel to the office of Interior Secretary through the Senate, as well as passing numerous major bills, such as the Alaska Native Claims Settlement Act in 1971, the Trans-Alaska Pipeline Authorization Act in 1973, something which endeared the Senator to President Richard Nixon, and, an act which Stevens had picked as his key legislative achievement in 2006, the Magnuson–Stevens Fishery Conservation and Management Act, along with Washington Senator Warren Magnuson. Stevens ability to do so helped propel him in popularity, allowing him to easily win re-election in 1970 in an upset. Stevens would continue to win re-election easily until his defeat in 2008 by Anchorage Mayor, Mark Begich, the son of former U.S. Representative from Alaska Nick Begich.
Later in his career, Stevens would bring in billions of dollars of pork barrel funding, something which Stevens was unapologetic for, once stating "I'm guilty of asking for pork, and I'm proud of the Senate for giving it to me."

Elections

After practicing private law for a year, Stevens ran for the U.S. Senate in 1962 and won the Republican nomination, defeating only trivial opposition. Stevens was considered a long-shot candidate against the popular former Governor and incumbent Democratic U.S. Senator Ernest Gruening, and he lost in the general election by a 16-point margin, a margin which was much closer than expected, considering Bartlett's 27-point win in the prior election, the stronghold of the Democratic Party in Alaska, and the long service of Gruening. In 1968, Stevens once again ran for the U.S. Senate, but lost in the Republican primary to Anchorage Mayor Elmer E. Rasmuson. Rasmuson lost the general election to Democrat Mike Gravel. In December 1968, after the death of Alaska's other senator, Democrat Bob Bartlett, Governor Wally Hickel appointed Stevens to the seat. Since Gravel took office ten days after Stevens did, Stevens was Alaska's senior senator for all but ten days of his forty-year tenure in the Senate. However, on the account of Stevens' long career in public service, and age, Gravel took no issue with the situation.

In a special election in 1970, Stevens won the right to finish the remainder of Bartlett's term. He won the seat in his own right in 1972, and was reelected in 1978, 1984, 1990, 1996 and 2002 elections. His final term expired in January 2009. Since his first election to a full term in 1972, Stevens never received less than 66% of the vote before his 2008 defeat for re-election.

Stevens lost his Senate re-election bid in 2008. He won the Republican primary in August and was defeated by Anchorage Mayor Mark Begich in the general election. He was the longest-serving U.S. Senator in history to lose re-election, beating out Warren Magnuson, who had served over 36 years before his defeat to Slade Gorton in 1980.

Stevens, who would have been 90 years old on election day, had filed to run for a rematch against Begich in the 2014 election, but he was killed in a plane crash on August 9, 2010. Dan Sullivan would defeat Begich in the election by a margin of 3.1%.

Committees and leadership positions

Stevens served as the Assistant Republican Leader (Whip) from 1977 to 1985. Stevens served as Acting Minority Leader during Howard Baker's run for president during the 1980 Republican primaries. In 1994, after the Republicans took control of the Senate, Stevens was appointed Chairman of the Senate Rules Committee. Stevens became the Senate's President Pro Tempore when Republicans regained control of the chamber as a result of the 2002 mid-term elections, during which the previous most senior Republican senator and former President Pro Tempore Strom Thurmond retired.

After Howard Baker retired in 1984, Stevens sought the position of Republican (and then-Majority) leader, running against Bob Dole, Dick Lugar, Jim McClure and Pete Domenici. As Republican whip, Stevens was theoretically the favorite to succeed Baker, but lost to Dole in a fourth ballot, by a vote of 28 - 25.

Stevens chaired the Senate Appropriations Committee from 1997 to 2005, except for the 18 months when Democrats controlled the chamber. The chairmanship gave Stevens considerable influence among fellow Senators, who relied on him for home-state project funds. Even before becoming chairman of the Appropriations Committee, Stevens secured large sums of federal money for the State of Alaska. Due to Republican Party rules that limited committee chairmanships to six years, Stevens gave up the Appropriations gavel at the start of the 109th Congress, in January 2005. He was succeeded by Thad Cochran of Mississippi.

He chaired the United States Senate Committee on Commerce, Science and Transportation during the 109th Congress, becoming the committee's ranking member after the Democrats regained control of the Senate for the 110th Congress. He resigned his ranking-member position on the committee due to his indictment.

At various times, Stevens also served as chairman of the Senate Governmental Affairs Committee, the Senate Ethics Committee, the Arms Control Observer Group, and the Joint Committee on the Library of Congress.

Due to Stevens's long tenure and that of the state's sole congressman, Don Young, Alaska was considered to have clout in national politics well beyond its small population (the state was long the smallest in population and is currently 47th, ahead of only Wyoming, North Dakota, and Vermont).

Political positions

Internet and net neutrality

On June 28, 2006, the Senate commerce committee was in the final day of three days of hearings, during which the Committee members considered more than two hundred amendments to an omnibus telecommunications bill. Stevens authored the bill, S. 2686, the Communications, Consumer's Choice, and Broadband Deployment Act of 2006.

Senators Olympia Snowe (R-ME) and Byron Dorgan (D-ND) cosponsored and spoke on behalf of an amendment that would have inserted strong network neutrality mandates into the bill. In between speeches by Snowe and Dorgan, Stevens gave a vehement 11-minute speech using colorful language to explain his opposition to the amendment. Stevens referred to the Internet as "not a big truck", but a "series of tubes" that could be clogged with information. Stevens also confused the terms Internet and e-mail. Soon after, Stevens's interpretation of how the Internet works became a topic of amusement and ridicule by some in the blogosphere. The phrases "the Internet is not a big truck" and "series of tubes" became internet memes and were prominently featured on U.S. television shows including Comedy Central's The Daily Show.

CNET journalist Declan McCullagh called "series of tubes" an "entirely reasonable" metaphor for the Internet, noting that some computer operating systems use the term 'pipes' to describe interprocess communication. McCullagh also suggested that ridicule of Stevens was almost entirely political, espousing his belief that if Stevens has spoken in a similar manner, yet in support of Net Neutrality, "the online chortling would have been muted or nonexistent."

Logging

Stevens was a long-standing proponent of logging and championed a plan that would allow  of roadless old growth forest to be clear-cut. Stevens said this would revive Alaska's timber industry and bring jobs to unemployed loggers; however, the proposal would mean that thousands of miles of roads would be constructed at the expense of the United States Forest Service, judged to cost taxpayers $200,000 per job created.

Abortion

Stevens considered himself pro-abortion. According to On the Issues and NARAL, Stevens had a mildly anti-abortion voting record, despite some notable pro-abortion votes.

However, as a former member of the moderate Republican Main Street Partnership, Stevens supported human embryonic stem cell research.

Global warming

Stevens was long an avowed skeptic of anthropogenic climate change. In early 2007, he acknowledged that humans were changing the climate, and began supporting legislation to combat climate change. "Global climate change is a very serious problem for us, becoming more so every day," he said at a Senate hearing in February 2007, adding that he was "concerned about the human impacts on our climate". But in September 2007, he claimed, "We're at the end of a long, long term of warming. 700 to 900 years of increased temperature, a very slow increase. We think we're close to the end of that. If we're close to the end of that, that means that we'll starting getting cooler gradually, not very rapidly, but cooler once again and stability might come to this region for a period of another 900 years." In fact, the scientific consensus on climate change is that the climate will keep warming as long as humans keep adding greenhouse gases to the atmosphere.

Civil rights and U.S. Supreme Court

Stevens voted in favor of the bill establishing Martin Luther King Jr. Day as a federal holiday and the Civil Rights Restoration Act of 1987 (as well as to override President Reagan's veto). Stevens voted in favor of the nominations of Robert Bork and Clarence Thomas to the U.S. Supreme Court.

Criticism of political positions and actions

During his tenure as Senator, Stevens was subject to frequent criticism that included:
 Citizens Against Government Waste accused Stevens of pork barrel politics and kept a list of his pet projects.
 In 2005, Stevens strongly supported federal transportation funds to build the Gravina Island Bridge, which quickly became derided due to its price tag (approximately $398million) and as an unnecessary Bridge to Nowhere. Stevens threatened to quit the Senate if the funds were diverted.
 Additionally, he received criticism for introducing a bill in January 2007 that would heavily restrict access to social networking sites from public schools and libraries. Sites falling under the language of this bill could include MySpace, Facebook, Digg, English Wikipedia, and Reddit.
 In 2007, Stevens added $3.5million into a Senate spending bill to help finance an airport to serve a remote Alaskan island. The airstrip would connect about a hundred permanent residents of Akutan, but the biggest beneficiary would have been the Seattle-based Trident Seafoods which operated "one of the world's largest seafood processing plants," on that volcanic Aleutians island. In December 2006, a federal grand jury considering circumstances involved in an Alaska political corruption probe ordered Trident and other seafood companies to produce documents about ties to the senator's son, former Alaska Fisheries Marketing Board Chairman Ben Stevens. Trident's chief executive, Charles Bundrant, was a longtime supporter of Stevens, and Bundrant with his family contributed $17,300 since 1995 to Stevens's political campaigns and $10,800 to his leadership PAC, while Bundrant also gave $55,000 to the National Republican Senatorial Campaign Committee.

Controversies

In December 2003, the Los Angeles Times reported that Stevens had taken advantage of lax Senate rules to use his political influence to obtain a large amount of his personal wealth. According to the article, while Stevens was already a millionaire "thanks to investments with businessmen who received government contracts or other benefits with his help," the lawmaker who was in charge of $800billion a year, writes "preferences he wrote into law," from which he then benefits.

Home remodeling and VECO

On May 29, 2007, the Anchorage Daily News reported that the FBI and a federal grand jury were investigating an extensive remodeling project at Stevens's home in Girdwood. Stevens's Alaska home was raided by the FBI and IRS on July 30, 2007. The remodeling work doubled the size of the modest home. Public records show that the house was  after the remodeling, and that the property was valued at $271,300 in 2003, including a $5,000 increase in land value. The remodel in 2000 was organized by Bill Allen, a founder of the VECO Corporation (an oil-field service company) and was alleged by prosecutors to have cost VECO and the various contractors $250,000 or more. However, the residential contractor who finished the renovation for VECO, Augie Paone, "believes the [Stevens's] remodeling could have costif all the work was done efficientlyaround $130,000 to $150,000, close to the figure Stevens cited last year." Stevens paid $160,000 for the renovations "and assumed that covered everything".

In June, the Anchorage Daily News reported that a federal grand jury in Washington, D.C., heard evidence in May about the expansion of Stevens's Girdwood home and other matters connecting Stevens to VECO. In mid-June, FBI agents questioned several aides who worked for Stevens as part of the investigation. In July, Washingtonian magazine reported that Stevens had hired "Washington's most powerful and expensive lawyer", Brendan Sullivan Jr., in response to the investigation. In 2006, during wiretapped conversations with Bill Allen, shortly after the VECO offices were searched and Allen agreed to cooperate with the investigation, Stevens expressed worries over legal complications arising from the sweeping federal investigations into Alaskan politics. "The worst that can happen to us is we run up a bunch of legal fees, and might lose and we might have to pay a fine, might have to serve a little time in jail. I hope to Christ it never gets to that, and I don't think it will," Stevens said. Stevens continued, "I think they might be listening to this conversation right now, for Christ Sake." On the witness stand, Allen testified that VECO staff who had worked on his own house had charged "way too much", leaving him uncertainthat he would be embarrassed to bill Stevens for overpriced labor.

Former aide

The Justice Department also examined whether federal funds that Stevens steered to the Alaska SeaLife Center may have enriched a former aide. However, no charges were ever filed.

Bob Penney

In September 2007, The Hill reported that Stevens had "steered millions of federal dollars to a sportfishing industry group founded by Bob Penney, a longtime friend". In 1998, Stevens invested $15,000 in a Utah land deal managed by Penney; in 2004, Stevens sold his share of the property for $150,000.

Trial, conviction, and reversal

Indictment

On July 29, 2008, Stevens was indicted by a federal grand jury on seven counts of failing to properly report gifts, a felony, and found guilty at trial three months later (October 27, 2008). The charges related to renovations to his home and alleged gifts from VECO Corporation, claimed to be worth more than $250,000. The charges were associated with those exposed in what became known as "Operation Polar Pen." The indictment followed a lengthy investigation by the Federal Bureau of Investigation (FBI) and the Internal Revenue Service (IRS) for possible corruption by Alaskan politicians and was based in part on Stevens's extensive relationship with Bill Allen. Allen owned racehorses, including a partnership in the stud-horse So Long Birdie, which included Stevens and eight others, and which was managed by Bob Persons. The FBI not only had calls between Allen and Stevens (made after Allen became a cooperating witness), they had thousands of wiretapped conversations involving the phones of both Allen and VECO Vice President Rick Smith. They had also videotaped meetings between Allen and state legislators at VECO's hotel suite in Juneau, the state capitol. Allen had testified that he bribed Ted's son Ben, the former Alaska Senate president. A former VECO employee said he did campaign fundraising work for Stevens while on VECO's payroll, a violation of federal law. Allen, then an oil service company executive, had earlier pleaded guilty (sentence suspended pending his cooperation in gathering evidence and giving testimony in other trials) to bribing several Alaskan state legislators. Stevens declared, "I'm innocent," and pleaded not guilty to the charges in a federal district court on July 31, 2008. Stevens asserted his right to a speedy trial so he could have the opportunity to clear his name promptly and requested that the trial be held before the 2008 election.

U.S. District Judge in Washington, D.C. Emmet G. Sullivan, on October 2, 2008, denied the mistrial petition of Stevens's chief counsel, Brendan Sullivan, that made allegations of withholding evidence by prosecutors. Thus, the latter were admonished and would submit themselves for an internal probe by the United States Department of Justice. Brady v. Maryland requires prosecutors to give a defendant any material exculpatory evidence. Judge Sullivan had earlier admonished the prosecution for sending home to Alaska a witness who might have helped the defense.

The case was prosecuted by Principal Deputy Chief Brenda K. Morris, Trial Attorneys Nicholas A. Marsh and Edward P. Sullivan of the Criminal Division's Public Integrity Section, headed by Chief William M. WelchII; and Assistant U.S. Attorneys Joseph W. Bottini and James A. Goeke from the District of Alaska.

Guilty verdict and repercussions

On October 27, 2008, Stevens was found guilty of all seven counts of making false statements. Stevens was only the fifth sitting senator to be convicted by a jury in U.S. history, and the first since Senator Harrison A. Williams (D-NJ) in 1981 (although Senator David Durenberger (R-MN) pleaded guilty to a felony more recently, in 1995). Stevens faced a maximum penalty of five years per charge. His sentencing hearing was originally arranged February 25, but his attorneys told Judge Sullivan they would file applications to dispute the verdict by early December. However, it was thought unlikely that Stevens would spend significant time in prison.

Within a few days of his conviction, Stevens faced bipartisan calls for his resignation. Both parties' presidential candidates, Barack Obama and John McCain, were quick to call for Stevens to stand down. Obama said Stevens needed to resign to help "put an end to the corruption and influence-peddling in Washington". McCain said Stevens "has broken his trust with the people" and needed to step down, a call echoed by his running mate, Sarah Palin, governor of Stevens's home state. Senate Minority Leader Mitch McConnell, as well as fellow Republican Senators Norm Coleman, John Sununu and Gordon Smith also called for Stevens to resign. McConnell said there would be "zero tolerance" for a convicted felon serving in the Senate, strongly hinting that he would support Stevens's expulsion from the Senate unless Stevens resigned first. Late on November 1, Senate Majority Leader Harry Reid confirmed that he would schedule a vote on Stevens's expulsion, saying "a convicted felon is not going to be able to serve in the United States Senate." Had Stevens won his election, then been expelled, a special election would have been held to fill his seat through the remainder of the term, until January 2015. Some speculated that Palin would have tried to run for the Senate via such a special election. No sitting Senator has been expelled since the Civil War.

Nonetheless, during a debate with his opponent, Anchorage, Alaska Mayor Mark Begich, days after his conviction, Stevens continued to claim innocence. "I have not been convicted. I have a case pending against me, and probably the worst case of prosecutorial misconduct by the prosecutors that is known." Stevens also cited plans to appeal. On November 4, 2008, eight days after his conviction, Begich went on to defeat Stevens by 3,724 votes, a 1.3% margin. Stevens was the longest-serving U.S. Senator in history to lose re-election, beating out Warren Magnuson's record in 1980.

On November 13, Senator Jim DeMint of South Carolina announced he would move to have Stevens expelled from the Senate Republican Conference (caucus) regardless of the results of the election. (Absentee, provisional, and early ballots were, at the time, still being tallied in the close election.) Losing his caucus membership would cost Stevens his committee assignments. However, DeMint later decided to postpone offering his motion, saying that while there were enough votes to throw Stevens out, it would be moot if Stevens lost his reelection bid. Stevens ended up losing the Senate race, and on November 20, 2008, gave his last speech to the Senate, which was met with a loud standing ovation by the other members of the chamber.

Government concealment of evidence

In February 2009, FBI agent Chad Joy filed a whistleblower affidavit, alleging that prosecutors and FBI agents conspired to withhold and conceal evidence that could have resulted in acquittal. In his affidavit, Joy alleged that prosecutors intentionally sent a key witness, former VECO employee Robert Burnette "Rocky" Williams, who had testified before a grand jury in 2006, back home to Alaska. Williams had performed poorly during a mock cross-examination. The prosecution informed Judge Sullivan that it had concerns regarding the health of the witness. Williams was terminally ill, experiencing liver failure, which causes confusion. He died on December 30, 2008. Joy further alleged that the prosecutors intentionally withheld Brady material including redacted prior statements of a witness, and a memo from Bill Allen stating that Senator Stevens probably would have paid for the goods and services if asked. Joy further inferred that a female FBI agent had an inappropriate relationship with Allen, who also gave gifts to FBI agents and helped one agent's relative get a job.

As a result of Joy's affidavit and claims by the defense that prosecutorial misconduct had caused an unfair trial, Judge Sullivan ordered a hearing to be held on February 13, 2009, to determine whether a new trial should be ordered. At the February 13 hearing, Judge Sullivan held the prosecutors in contempt for having failed to deliver documents to Stevens's legal counsel.

Convictions voided and indictment dismissed

On April 1, 2009, on behalf of U.S. Attorney General Eric Holder, Paul O'Brien submitted a "Motion of The United States To Set Aside The Verdict And Dismiss The Indictment With Prejudice" in connection with case No. 08-231 . Federal judge Emmet G. Sullivan soon signed the order. Since it occurred prior to sentencing it had the effect of vacating Stevens's conviction. During the trial, Sullivan expressed concern and anger regarding prosecutorial conduct and related issues. Holder, who had taken office only three months earlier, was reportedly very angry at the prosecutors' apparent withholding of exculpatory evidence and wanted to send a message that prosecutorial misconduct would not be tolerated under his watch. After Sullivan held the prosecutors in contempt, Holder replaced the entire trial team, including top officials in the public integrity section. The final straw for Holder, according to numerous reports, was the discovery of a previously undocumented interview with Bill Allen, the prosecution's star witness, that raised the possibility prosecutors had knowingly allowed Allen to perjure himself. Allen said the fair market value of the repairs to the Stevenses' house was around $80,000, considerably less than the $250,000 he said it cost at trial. More seriously, Allen said in the interview that he didn't recall talking to Bob Persons, a friend of Stevens, regarding the repair bill for the Stevenses' house. This directly contradicted Allen's testimony at trial, in which he claimed Stevens asked him to give Persons a note Stevens sent him asking for a bill on the repair work. At trial, Allen said Persons had told him the note shouldn't be taken seriously because "Ted's just covering his ass." Even without the notes, Stevens's attorneys claimed Allen was lying about the conversation.

Later that day, Stevens's attorney, Brendan Sullivan, said Holder's decision was forced by "extraordinary evidence of government corruption". He also claimed that prosecutors not only withheld evidence but "created false testimony that they gave us and actually presented false testimony in the courtroom".

On April 7, 2009, federal judge Sullivan formally accepted Holder's motion to set aside the verdict and throw out the indictment, declaring "There was never a judgment of conviction in this case. The jury's verdict is being set aside and has no legal effect," and calling it the worst case of prosecutorial misconduct he'd ever seen. He also initiated a criminal contempt investigation of six members of the prosecution. Although an internal investigation by the Office of Professional Responsibility was already underway, Sullivan said he was not willing to trust it due to the "shocking and disturbing" nature of the misconduct.

In 2012, the Special Counsel report on the case was released. It said,

Upon the release of the Special Counsel report, the Stevens defense team released an analysis of its own which stated, "The meticulous detail paints a picture of the government's shocking conduct in which prosecutors repeatedly ignored the law. The Report shows how prosecutors abandoned their oath of office and the ethical standards of their profession. They abandoned all decency and sound judgment when they indicted and prosecuted an 84-year old man who served his country in World WarII combat, and who served with distinction for 40 years in the U.S. Senate."

A statement issued by Stevens's widow Catherine said, "I can say that the Stevens family continues to be shocked by the depth and breadth of the government's misconduct."

Mark Bonner, associate professor of law at Ave Maria School of Law, has argued that the court acted improperly by appointing a special prosecutor.  Moreover, he claims that the Brady standard is a very high bar, such that the judge should not have found any of the prosecutors in criminal contempt.

Personal life

Achievements and honors 
Stevens was voted Alaskan of the Century in 2000 by the Alaskan of the Year Committee. In the same year, the Alaska Legislature renamed the Anchorage airport, the largest in the state, to the Ted Stevens Anchorage International Airport.

The Ted Stevens Foundation is a charity established to "assist in educating and informing the public about the career of Senator Ted Stevens". The chairman is Tim McKeever, a lobbyist who was treasurer of Stevens's 2004 campaign. In May 2006, McKeever said the charity was "nonpartisan and nonpolitical", and that Stevens does not raise money for the foundation, although he has attended some fund-raisers.

November 18, 2003, the Senator's 80th birthday, was declared Senator Ted Stevens Appreciation Day by Governor of Alaska Frank Murkowski.

When discussing issues that were especially important to him (such as opening up the Arctic National Wildlife Refuge to oil drilling), Stevens wore a necktie with The Incredible Hulk on it to show his seriousness. Marvel Comics has sent him free Hulk paraphernalia and has thrown a Hulk party for him. On December 21, 2005, Stevens said the vote to block drilling in the Arctic National Wildlife Refuge "has been the saddest day of my life".

On December 30, 2006, Stevens delivered a eulogy of Gerald R. Ford at the 38th President's funeral service. On April 13, 2007, Stevens was recognized as the longest-serving (38 years) Republican senator in history. (He served in total forty years and ten days.) Senator Daniel Inouye, a Democrat from Hawaii, referred to Stevens as "The Strom Thurmond of the Arctic Circle". Stevens held this record until he was overtaken by Orrin Hatch on January 13, 2017.

Death and legacy

On August 9, 2010, Stevens and seven other passengers including former NASA administrator Sean O'Keefe were aboard a de Havilland Canada DHC-3 Otter plane when it crashed about 17 miles north of Dillingham, Alaska, while en route to a private fishing lodge. Stevens was confirmed dead in the crash via a statement from his family. He and others were aboard the single-engine plane registered to Anchorage-based GCI Communication.

As Stevens's death was confirmed, Alaskan and national political figures from all sides of the political spectrum spoke highly of the man many Alaskans knew as "Uncle Ted". Senator Lisa Murkowski said of Stevens: "His entire life was dedicated to public servicefrom his days as a pilot in World WarII to his four decades of service in the United States Senate. He truly was the greatest of the 'Greatest Generation.

The Pacific Aviation Museum Pearl Harbor honored Stevens with a plaque and a display of memorabilia of his wartime service in China-Burma-India. Senator Mark Begich, his successor, stated, "Over his four decades of public service in the U.S. Senate, Senator Stevens was a forceful advocate for Alaska who helped transform our state in the challenging years after Statehood" and former president George H. W. Bush released a statement that "Ted Stevens loved the Senate; he loved Alaska; and he loved his familyand he will be dearly missed." President Barack Obama said in a statement, "Ted Stevens devoted his career to serving the people of Alaska and fighting for our men and women in uniform."

Memorial services

Hundreds of Alaskans attended a memorial Mass for Stevens at Holy Family Cathedral in downtown Anchorage on August 16. On August 17, mourners paid their respects as he lay in a closed casket at All Saints Episcopal Church, also in downtown Anchorage, which was Stevens's home church. His funeral at Anchorage Baptist Temple on August 18 was attended by some three thousand people, including then-Vice President Joe Biden, former Governor Sarah Palin, then-Governor Sean Parnell and three other former governors, eleven senators, nine former senators, and two congressmen. Stevens was interred at Arlington National Cemetery on September 28.

USS Ted Stevens

In January 2019, the US Navy announced that a FlightIII  would be named . It will be constructed at Huntington Ingalls Industries' Ingalls shipbuilding division in Pascagoula, Mississippi.

Electoral history

See also

 Alaska political corruption probe
 List of fatalities from aviation accidents
 Mount Stevens
 List of federal political scandals in the United States

Notes and references

External links

 Federal Bureau of Investigation Records: The Vault - Ted Stevens
 Timeline: Ted Stevens from the Anchorage Daily News
 

 Ted Stevens News from The New York Times
 Obituary from BBC News
 Memorial Addresses and Other Tributes Held in the Senate and House of Representatives of the United States Together With Memorial Services in Honor of Ted Stevens, Late a Senator from Alaska, One Hundred Eleventh Congress, Second Session
 Ted Stevens Paper Projects  from Alaska and Polar Regions Collections of Elmer E. Rasmuson and BioSciences Libraries
 
 Ted Stevens at 100 Years of Alaska's Legislature
 President Bush: Stevens Loved Alaska APRN. May 17, 2017.

1923 births
2010 deaths
21st-century American politicians
Accidental deaths in Alaska
Aviators killed in aviation accidents or incidents in the United States
Burials at Arlington National Cemetery
Harvard Law School alumni
Republican Party members of the Alaska House of Representatives
Overturned convictions in the United States
Politicians from Anchorage, Alaska
Politicians from Fairbanks, Alaska
People from Manhattan Beach, California
Politicians from Indianapolis
Presidents pro tempore of the United States Senate
Recipients of the Air Medal
Recipients of the Distinguished Flying Cross (United States)
Recipients of the Olympic Order
Republican Party United States senators from Alaska
Survivors of aviation accidents or incidents
United States Army Air Forces officers
United States Army Air Forces pilots of World War II
United States Attorneys for the District of Alaska
University of California, Los Angeles alumni
Victims of aviation accidents or incidents in 2010
Military personnel from Fairbanks, Alaska
Military personnel from Anchorage, Alaska
Military personnel from Indiana
20th-century American Episcopalians
Military personnel from California
Solicitors of the United States Department of the Interior